The Woodies was the nickname given to the tennis doubles pairing of Australians Todd Woodbridge and Mark Woodforde, one of the most successful pairings in tennis history.

The Woodies combined Woodforde's left-handed baseline play with Woodbridge's right-handed net skills. They were the ATP Doubles Team of the Year five times, and won 61 ATP doubles titles. The pair won eleven major titles: one French Open, two Australian Opens, two US Opens, and a record six Wimbledons. They also won two Tour Finals titles in 1992 and 1996.

Representing Australia, the Woodies won an Olympic gold medal for Australia at the 1996 Atlanta Olympics, and a silver medal at the 2000 Sydney Olympics. They often played for Australia in the Davis Cup, including in three finals. In 1999, they helped Australia to its first Davis Cup victory in 13 years.

The pairing ended in 2000, when Woodforde retired from professional tennis. Woodbridge continued his doubles success with Jonas Björkman, until Björkman ended the partnership in 2004; Woodbridge then partnered with Mahesh Bhupathi of India before retiring himself in 2005.

The Woodies were inducted into the Australian Tennis Hall of Fame on Australia Day in January 2010. Their bronzed statues were placed with those of other Australian tennis greats at Melbourne Park, site of the Australian Open.

Doubles titles (61)

Runners-up (18)

Team competition titles (1)

Runners-up (1)

Doubles performance timeline

² held in Stockholm 1990–94, Essen in 1995

Australian male tennis players
Nicknamed groups of tennis players
Nicknamed groups of Olympic competitors
Tennis doubles teams